Golf Street railway station is located on Golf Street in Carnoustie, Angus, Scotland, and serves the town's central areas. It is sited  from the former Dundee East station, on the Dundee to Aberdeen line, between Barry Links and Carnoustie. ScotRail, who manage the station, operate all services.

History 
The station opened in 1960 as Golf Street Halt before changing its name on 16 May 1983.

Location 
The station is the nearest to the Carnoustie Golf Links. During the 1999 Open Championship, extra services were laid on to bring spectators to the course, significantly boosting passenger figures for that year.

Facilities 
Facilities are incredibly low at Golf Street, consisting of just two benches (one on each platform) and a shelter on platform 2. Both platforms have step-free access. As there are no facilities to purchase tickets, passengers must buy one in advance, or from the guard on the train.

Passenger volume 
Patronage of the station is currently very low. In the Strategic Rail Authority's 2002/3 financial year, only nine people (excluding season ticket holders) paid fares at Golf Street station, with nine disembarking, making it the third least busy station in the United Kingdom, after  and neighbouring . In 2005/06 there were 65 passenger entries/exits at the station (9th lowest in the UK), but this dropped to 38 (4th lowest) in 2006/07.

The statistics cover twelve month periods that start in April.

Services 
British Rail operated local passenger services between Dundee and Arbroath until May 1990. Since these were discontinued, most of the intermediate stations have had only a very sparse ("parliamentary") service, provided so as to avoid the difficulty of formal closure procedures. As of May 2022, there is a total of four trains per day (two in each direction): southbound, there is an 06:15 to Dundee and an 07:51 to Glasgow Queen Street, whilst northbound there is an 18:14 and an 18:51, both to Arbroath. There is no Sunday service.

References

External links 

Railway stations in Angus, Scotland
Railway stations opened by British Rail
Railway stations served by ScotRail
Low usage railway stations in the United Kingdom
Railway stations in Great Britain opened in 1960
1960 establishments in Scotland